Glen Ester Clark  (March 8,    1940 – January 25, 2018) was a pinch hitter in Major League Baseball who played for the Atlanta Braves during the  season. He was born in Austin, Texas.
 
Clark was 26 years old when he entered the majors in 1967 with Atlanta, being limited to pinch-hitting duties. He appeared in four games and was hitless in four at-bats.

Clark died January 25, 2018.

See also
Cup of coffee

References

External links

Retrosheet

1941 births
2018 deaths
African-American baseball players
Atlanta Braves players
Dublin Braves players
Boise Braves players
Savannah Senators players
Austin Senators players
Dallas–Fort Worth Spurs players
Yakima Braves players
Austin Braves players
Reading Phillies players
Columbus Astros players
Oklahoma City 89ers players
Baseball players from Austin, Texas
20th-century African-American sportspeople
21st-century African-American people